One Amazing Thing is a 2009 novel by award-winning novelist and poet Chitra Banerjee Divakaruni. It was first published in the United States in Voice by Hyperion in 2009, and later in Hamish Hamilton by Penguin Books India in 2010.

The novel presents a group of people from various backgrounds trapped inside a visa office after a massive earthquake, and tells their story of survival and revelations in hopeless situation with no easy way out. The book is commended for very well-written characters and captivating stories, but it is also noted that some of the presented situations are too culture-specific or otherwise have been widely explored.

Plot summary
A group of 9 people are trapped in the visa office at an Indian Consulate after a massive earthquake hits an unnamed American city. Among them are two visa officers, Malathi and Mangalamon, the verge of an adulterous affair; Jiang, a Chinese-Indian woman in her last years and her gifted teenage granddaughter Lily; Cameron, an ex-soldier haunted by guilt; Uma, an Indian-American girl bewildered by her parents' decision to return to Kolkata after 20 years; Tariq, a young Muslim man angry with the new America; and an enraged and bitter elderly white couple named Mr. and Mrs. Pritchett.

After many attempts to find a way out of the debris that has formed around them, the group concludes that there is nothing they can do but wait for help. They ration out the little food and water that they have and try to make it last as long as possible.

As they wait to be saved− or to die − they begin to tell each other stories, each recalling "one amazing thing" in their lives, sharing things they have never spoken of before. Their tales are tragic and life-affirming, revealing what it means to be human and the incredible power of storytelling.

Characters 

 Cameron - Cameron is a veteran who becomes the leader of the group. He suffers from asthma and aspires to adopt a young girl from India.
 Jiang - Jiang is an elderly Indian-Chinese women who fell in love with an Indian man named Mohit but wasn't able to pursue the taboo relationship. She's the grandmother to Lily. 
 Lily - Lily is a gifted flute player who rebels against her family by wearing black and cutting school. 
 Malathi - Malathi is an employee at the visa office who aspires to open her own beauty shop.
 Mangalam - Mangalam is another employee at the visa office. He is married, but attracted to Malathi. He ends up kissing her at the office.
 Mr. Pritchett - Mr. Pritchett is a hardworking accountant, who had a traumatic childhood with abusive parents. He is dealing with his wife's attempted suicide, and his addiction to smoking.
 Mrs. Pritchett - Mrs. Pritchett gave up her dreams of owning a successful bakery to instead marry Mr. Pritchett. She's depressed and tried to kill herself shortly before the couple decided to travel to India.
 Tariq - Tariq is resentful toward the treatment of Muslims in America. He is in love with a girl named Farah and doesn't particularly like Cameron's leadership. His father was taken away as a 9/11 suspect.
 Uma - Uma is a graduate student who has a copy of The Canterbury Tales by Geoffrey Chaucer with her at the visa office. She is saddened by her father's proposed divorce from her mother.

References

Novels by Chitra Banerjee Divakaruni
2009 American novels